The 2010 Hawaii gubernatorial election was held on November 2, 2010, to elect the next Governor and Lieutenant Governor of Hawaii. Incumbent Republican Governor Linda Lingle was term-limited and not eligible to run for re-election. The Democratic Party nominated Representative Neil Abercrombie, and the Republican Party nominated incumbent Lieutenant Governor Duke Aiona. In the election, Neil Abercrombie defeated Lieutenant Governor Duke Aiona. Abercrombie was sworn in as the state's 7th Governor on December 6, 2010.

Primary results

Democratic
Neil Abercrombie, former U.S. Representative and candidate for U.S. Senate in 1970
Mufi Hannemann, former Mayor of Honolulu, nominee for HI-01 in 1986, and candidate in 1990
Arturo P. (Art) Reyes
Miles Shiratori
Van K. Tanabe

Polling

Republican
Duke Aiona, Lieutenant Governor of Hawaii
John Carroll, former state senator and representative

Non-partisan
Tony Clapes
Paul Manner
 Thomas (Tom) W. Pollard, critical care Doctor of Osteopathic Medicine

Free Energy Party
Daniel H. Cunningham

Lieutenant governor primary
Eleven candidates ran for their political parties' nominations in the lieutenant governor primary election on September 18: seven Democrats, two Republicans, one independent, and one Free Energy Party candidate.

Democratic Party
Lyla Berg, 59, Hawaiian State Representative first elected in 2004 to represent the Kāhala area; former teacher and principal
Robert Bunda, 63, state legislator since 1983: State Representative from 1983 until 1994 and Senator from 1994 until 2010; President of the Hawaii Senate for five years. Resigned from office to run for Lieutenant Governor.
Steve Hirakami, 64, principal of a charter school in Pahoa, on the Big Island of Hawai'i
Gary Hooser, 56, former state Senator from Kauai. Campaign based largely  on support of civil unions.
Jon Riki Karamatsu, 35, state legislator first elected in 2002 to represent the Waipahu area; chairman of the state House Judiciary Committee
Norman Sakamoto, 63, sitting state Senator first elected in 1996 to represent the Kalihi, Salt Lake, and Pearl Ridge neighborhoods of Honolulu; chairman of the state Senate Education and Housing Committee; opponent of civil unions
Brian Schatz, 37, former state legislator and former chairman of the Hawaiian Democratic Party. Resident of Honolulu.

Republican Party
Lynn Finnegan, 39, state legislator since 2002; Republican leader in the State House since 2005. Resident of Aiea, Hawaii.
Adrienne King, 62, lawyer for more than thirty years. Resident of Honolulu, daughter-in-law to judge Samuel Pailthorpe King.

Free Energy Party
Deborah Spence, no age provided, campaigns for the revival of hemp, which she calls the "most utilitarian plant", for use as a cellulose and biofuel. Resident of Hilo.

Independent
Leonard Kama, 67, retired security guard and deckhand campaigning on education and a reduction of homelessness. Resident of Kapolei.

General election

Predictions

Polling

Candidates
 Neil Abercrombie (D)
 Abercrombie's running mate was former state Democratic Party chairman Brian Schatz
 Duke Aiona (R)
 Aiona's running mate was State Rep. Lynn Finnegan
 Daniel Cunningham (FE)
 Cunningham's running mate was Deborah Spence
 Tom Pollard (I)
 Pollard's running mate was Leonard Kama

Results

See also
2010 United States gubernatorial elections

References

External links
Hawaii Office of Elections 
Hawaii Governor Candidates at Project Vote Smart 
Campaign contributions for 2010 Hawaii Governor from Follow the Money
2010 Hawaii Gubernatorial General Election graph of multiple polls from Pollster.com
Election 2010: Hawaii Governor from Rasmussen Reports
2010 Hawaii Governor Race from Real Clear Politics
2010 Hawaii Governor's Race from CQ Politics
Race Profile in The New York Times
Official campaign websites (Archived)
Neil Abercrombie
Duke Aiona
Mufi Hannemann

Gubernatorial
2010
Hawaii